Miller Lake is a large natural freshwater lake in the Cascade Range in western Klamath County in the U.S. state of Oregon.

Recreation at the lake includes fishing for stocked rainbow and brown trout and kokanee. The lake has been called "one of the best brown trout fisheries in the state". Many brown trout in the lake, which is open for night fishing as well as day fishing, exceed  in length.

The lake and its drainage system form the sole habitat for the Miller Lake lamprey. The species was nearly exterminated during the 1950s by state wildlife managers, who saw it as a threat to trout populations in the lake. Since its rediscovery in 1992, efforts have been underway to rebuild lamprey populations and reintroduce it to Miller Lake.

Miller Lake is also used for swimming and non-motorized boating. Hiking trails in the vicinity provide access to the Mount Thielsen Wilderness and the Pacific Crest Trail. Digit Point Campground at the lake has 64 individual camping sites with access to picnic tables, potable water, and toilets. Mosquito infestations may require repellent or headnets.

See also
 List of lakes in Oregon

References

External links
Photo of sunrise on the lake by Milt Hill

Lakes of Oregon
Lakes of Klamath County, Oregon
Fremont–Winema National Forest